The 1940 Oglethorpe Stormy Petrels football team represented Oglethorpe University in the sport of American football as a member of the Southern Intercollegiate Athletic Association (SIAA) during the 1940 college football season. This was the last large team from Oglethorpe before the war drafted so many students. Despite doing poorly, they had a strong schedule for an independent team. Practices were conducted at the North Fulton High School's field.

Schedule

References

Oglethorpe
Oglethorpe Stormy Petrels football seasons
Oglethorpe Stormy Petrels football